Terre-et-Marais (literally Land and Marsh) is a commune in the department of Manche, northwestern France.

Toponymy

The name of the commune refers to the marshes of Carentan.

History

The municipality was established on 1 January 2016 by merger of the former communes of Sainteny (the seat) and Saint-Georges-de-Bohon. The communes of Saint-Georges-de-Bohon and Sainteny become delegated communes.

Education

Sport

Administration

See also 
Communes of the Manche department

References

External links

 Terre-et-Marais official website 

Communes of Manche
Populated places established in 2016
2016 establishments in France